2008 Emmy Awards may refer to:

 60th Primetime Emmy Awards, the 2008 Emmy Awards ceremony honoring primetime programming during June 2007 – May 2008
 35th Daytime Emmy Awards, the 2008 Emmy Awards ceremony honoring daytime programming during 2007
 29th Sports Emmy Awards, the 2008 Emmy Awards ceremony honoring sports programming during 2007
 36th International Emmy Awards, honoring international programming

Emmy Award ceremonies by year